Stephen Todd Alexander (born November 7, 1975) is an American former professional football player who was a tight end in the National Football League (NFL). He was originally drafted by the Washington Redskins in the second round of the 1998 NFL Draft. He played college football at Oklahoma.

Alexander was selected to the Pro Bowl while with the Redskins in 2000. He has also played for the San Diego Chargers, Detroit Lions and Denver Broncos.

Early years
Alexander was a USA Today and Blue Chip Illustrated All-American at Chickasha High School, earning SuperPrep National Player-of-the-Year honors. He was all-state and a two-time all-district Defensive Player of the Year as a defensive end while lettering in basketball and track, in which he won the state high jump title (6 ft 8 in) as a junior. A member of the Oceanic Honor Society, Alexander graduated #16 in his high school class.

College career
Alexander totaled 104 career receptions for 1,591 yards (15.3 avg.) with six touchdowns at the University of Oklahoma. Following an outstanding senior season, Alexander picked up second-team All-Big 12 Conference honors. He was a first-team All-Big 8 Conference selection as a sophomore, leading the conference’s tight ends in receptions with 43 grabs for 580 yards (13.5 avg.) and two touchdowns. He was a member of the Gamma Rho chapter of Lambda Chi Alpha fraternity.

NFL career statistics

References

External links
 Denver Broncos bio

1975 births
Living people
American football tight ends
Denver Broncos players
Detroit Lions players
National Conference Pro Bowl players
Oklahoma Sooners football players
People from Chickasha, Oklahoma
San Diego Chargers players
Washington Redskins players